TSDB may refer to:
 
 Terrorist Screening Database
 Time series database